The Zawyeh Art Gallery is an Independent art foundation based in Ramallah, Palestine and founded by Ziad Anani in 2013 to support and promote local emerging and established artists from Palestine internationally.

Exhibitions 
2015 Narratives - Group Exhibition
2014 Pre-1948 Palestine brought to life in Nabil Anani’s paintings
 2014 In Memory - Group Exhibition
2014 Colors of Life - Group Exhibition, curated by Sulieman Mleahat
2013 Spaces - Group Exhibitions

Artists 
 Ayed Arafah
 Rana Samara
 Ahmad Kanaan
 Aasd Azi
 Hosni Radwan
 Jawad Al-Malhi
 Nabil Anani
 Sana Farah Bishara
 Sliman Mansour
 Tayseer Barakat

See also 
The Palestinian Museum
List of Palestinian artists

References

External links 
 

Arab art scene
Organizations based in Al-Bireh
Buildings and structures in Al-Bireh